Pausa District is one of ten districts of the province Paucar del Sara Sara in Peru.

The volcano Sara Sara is situated in the district.

References